"Sign of the Times", also known as "A Sign of the Times", is a song performed by Petula Clark, featured on her album My Love and released as a single in March 1966. It was the follow-up to her #1 US hit "My Love," the title track from the aforementioned album, and it continued her association with writer/producer Tony Hatch and songwriter Jackie Trent. However, "Sign of the Times" had a more percussive sound than had been evident on Clark's previous singles, or than would become evident on her later ones.
Clark discussed the song with Carl Wiser for Songfacts.com in 2013. "I loved it. It had a slightly different feel. 'A Sign of the Times,' I suppose you might expect some big political statement or something, but it was just a straight-ahead love song. I think Tony rather liked finding titles that made you think, like 'Don't Sleep in the Subway.' People would think, is it about drugs? Is it about this? And these were just straightforward songs. I like 'Sign of the Times.' I think it's a good song."

Single and chart performance
The song was recorded at the Pye Studios in Marble Arch in a session which featured guitarist Big Jim Sullivan and the Breakaways vocal group.

Clark introduced "A Sign of the Times" on The Ed Sullivan Show broadcast of 27 February 1966. The single would debut on the Billboard Hot 100 dated 26 March 1966 and reached its peak of #11 that 23 April. It peaked at #2 on Billboard'''s "Easy Listening" survey.

Beginning with her American breakout, "Downtown," Clark's singles had all had higher chart peaks in the US than in the UK. (The 1966 #23 UK hit "You're the One" was not released in the US.) "A Sign of the Times" became the most extreme example of this discrepancy by spending only one week – that of 27 April 1966 – in the UK Top 50 at #49. Although this trend was reversed with Clark's next single: "I Couldn't Live Without Your Love" (UK #6/US #9), Clark's last two 1966 single releases: "Who Am I?" (US #21) and  "Colour My World" (US #16) both failed to rank in the UK Top 50.

"A Sign of the Times" was a hit in Australia (#11) and South Africa (#2).

Live CD
"A Sign of the Times" also served as the title cut for a live CD by Petula Clark released by Varèse Sarabande 13 November 2001 comprising footage from her concert dates at Chrysler Hall in Norfolk, Virginia on 20 and 21 May 2001 featuring guests Richard Carpenter and Lou Rawls.

Track listing:
 "A Sign Of The Times"
 "I’m Not Afraid"
 "At Last" (with Lou Rawls)
 "Downtown"
 "I Dreamed A Dream"
 "Don’t Give Up"
 "I Need To Be In Love" (with Richard Carpenter)
 "The Wedding Song (There Is Love)"
 "With One Look"
 "Celebrate"
 "I Couldn’t Live Without Your Love" (with Lou Rawls and Richard Carpenter)
 "Here For You"
 "Look For The Silver Lining"
 "Vivre" (Notre Dame de Paris)

Notable reuse
 The Chrysler Hall engagement was also broadcast by PBS as the television special Petula Clark: A Sign of the Times which – augmented with archive footage from Clark's career – was released on DVD 26 March 2002.

 In 1969 B.F. Goodrich utilized the tune to "A Sign of the Times" for TV commercials advertising radial tires: the lyric was adjusted from "It's a sign of the times" to "It's the radial age".

 In 1986, "A Sign of the Times" was played in the video documentary An Amazin' Era: The New York Mets. The song was heard over footage of Mets fans carrying banners with messages on them.

 In 1999 Target department store ran a series of television commercials featuring "A Sign of the Times." The song's use as a jingle for Target was masterminded by the company's marketing director John Pellegrene who had been responsible for "A Sign of the Times" being used in the 1960s B.F. Goodrich ad campaign.

 A brief clip of "A Sign of the Times" was used on Dickie Goodman's 1966 novelty record Batman and his Grandmother.

2001 alleged "banning"

In 2001, the radio giant Clear Channel Communications listed "A Sign of the Times" on an advisory list of records that stations might voluntarily choose to avoid playing—on a temporary basis—in the wake of the September 11 terrorist attacks, the title possibly being construed to refer to a portent of the end of the world. Though some outlets falsely characterized this as a list of "banned" records, Clear Channel maintained that they had not banned any songs from any stations. The New York Times said that stations could and did choose to disregard the list.

Other versions
 An instrumental version by King Richard's Fluegel Knights was an Easy Listening hit reaching #19 on the Easy Listening chart in Billboard magazine in September 1966. King Richard's Fluegel Knights was a session group led by Bob Thompson and Richard Behrke.

 Michèle Richard (fr) recorded a French rendering of the song: "Si Tu Prenais Le Temps" (English translation: "If You Took the Time"), for her 1966 album Action '66.

 Jazz guitarist Joe Pass recorded a version on his 1966 album A Sign of the Times''.

References

Petula Clark songs
1966 singles
Pye Records singles
Warner Records singles
Disques Vogue singles
Songs written by Tony Hatch
Songs written by Jackie Trent
1966 songs
Song recordings produced by Tony Hatch